Prairie Township is one of ten townships in Crawford County, Illinois, USA.  As of the 2010 census, its population was 594 and it contained 268 housing units.

Geography

Unincorporated towns
 Annapolis
 Porterville
(This list is based on USGS data and may include former settlements.)

Cemeteries
The township contains these five cemeteries: Cox, Dix, Eaton, Mount Pleasant and Stanfield.

Demographics

School districts
 Hutsonville Community Unit School District 1
 Robinson Community Unit School District 2

Political districts
 Illinois' 15th congressional district
 State House District 109
 State Senate District 55

References

 United States Census Bureau 2007 TIGER/Line Shapefiles
 United States National Atlas

External links
 City-Data.com
 Illinois State Archives

Townships in Crawford County, Illinois
Townships in Illinois